Iksan–Pyeongtaek Expressway : Iksan, North Jeolla – Pyeongtaek, Gyeonggi
 Pyeongtaek–Paju Expressway : Pyeongtaek, Gyeonggi – Paju, Gyeonggi
 Pyeongtaek–Hwaseong Expressway : Pyeongtaek, Gyeonggi – Hwaseong, Gyeonggi
 Suwon–Munsan Expressway : Hwaseong, Gyeonggi – Paju, Gyeonggi